Boss Peak is an isolated black peak,  high, at the east side of the terminus of Jutland Glacier,  north-northeast of Thomson Peak, in the northwestern part of the Victory Mountains of Victoria Land. It was named by the northern party of the New Zealand Geological Survey Antarctic Expedition, 1963–64, partly for its resemblance to a shield boss, its aspect, and also as a reminiscence of Sir Ernest Shackleton's nickname, the "Boss".

References 

Mountains of Victoria Land
Borchgrevink Coast